The 2013 BWF Grand Prix Gold and Grand Prix was the seventh season of the BWF Grand Prix Gold and Grand Prix.

Schedule
Below is the schedule released by Badminton World Federation:

Results

Winners

Performance by countries
Tabulated below are the Grand Prix performances based on countries. Only countries who have won a title are listed:

Grand Prix Gold

German Open

Swiss Open

Australia Open

Malaysia Grand Prix Gold

Thailand Open

U.S. Open

Chinese Taipei Open

Indonesia Open

London Open

Bitburger Open

Korea Grand Prix Gold

Macau Open

Grand Prix

New Zealand Open

Canada Open

Russia Open

Dutch Open

Scottish Open

Vietnam Open

References

Grand Prix Gold and Grand Prix
BWF Grand Prix Gold and Grand Prix